Liu Yang (born 10 April 1990) is a Paralympian athlete from China competing mainly in T54 classification sprint events. Before achieving success as an athlete, Liu ventured into para-cycling, but switched shortly after his international cycling debut.

Paracycling career
Liu took up para-sport in 2006, and at first looked at para-cycling where he was classified as a handcyclist. He competed at the 2007 UCI Para-Cycling World Championships in Boudreaux, where he failed to qualify for the final of the road race, and finished 17th in the time trial.

Athletics career
Liu first represented China as a wheelchair racer at the 2011 IPC Athletics World Championships in Christchurch, New Zealand. He finished sixth in the T54 100m sprint and was part of the gold medal-winning relay team men's  (T53/54).

The next year Liu appeared at his first Summer Paralympic, the 2012 Games in London. He was again part of the Chinese team that took gold in the men's 400 metre relay, and also won an individual medal; silver in the 100m sprint. Further success came at the 2015 World Championships in Doha, with a relay gold and two further first places in the 100m and 400m sprints.

Personal history
Liu was born in Jinzhou, China in 1990. A tumor to his spine left him with paraplegia.

Notes

Paralympic athletes of China
Athletes (track and field) at the 2012 Summer Paralympics
Athletes (track and field) at the 2016 Summer Paralympics
Paralympic gold medalists for China
Paralympic silver medalists for China
Living people
1990 births
Medalists at the 2012 Summer Paralympics
Medalists at the 2016 Summer Paralympics
Chinese male sprinters
People from Jinzhou
Chinese male wheelchair racers
Runners from Liaoning
Paralympic medalists in athletics (track and field)
Athletes (track and field) at the 2020 Summer Paralympics
Medalists at the 2010 Asian Para Games
Medalists at the 2014 Asian Para Games